Candidate (Latin candidatus or candidata) is the name of various academic degrees, chiefly in Scandinavia, the Soviet Union, the Netherlands and Belgium. In Scandinavia, it is a higher professional-level degree usually corresponding to 5–7 years of studies, whereas in the Soviet states, it was a research degree roughly equivalent to the American Doctor of Philosophy degree. In the Netherlands and Belgium, it was an undergraduate first-cycle degree roughly comparable with the bachelor's degree.

The term is derived from Latin candida, meaning white. In Ancient Rome, men running for political office would usually wear togas chalked and bleached to be bright white at speeches, debates, conventions, and other public functions. The term candidate thus came to mean someone who seeks an office of some sort.

Scandinavia
In Scandinavia, the term was introduced in the early 18th century and referred to the higher degrees in theology, law and medicine. A candidate's degree in the relevant field (e.g. Candidate of Law) was a requirement for appointment to higher offices in the state administration (embede), including as priests, judges and state officials, and doctors. In Denmark, Norway and Sweden the term "candidate" was eventually used for most higher professional academic degrees, usually awarded after around 5–7 years of studies. In Norway, only a few candidate's degrees (such as cand.theol., cand.med. and cand.psychol.) are still awarded, while in Denmark and Sweden, all candidate's degrees are retained.

Examples of candidate's degrees in Scandinavia:
Candidate of Theology (candidatus theologiae)
Candidate of Law (candidatus juris)
Candidate of Medicine (candidatus medicinae)

There are several dozen such degrees in the three Scandinavian countries as well as Iceland and Finland.

Soviet Union

In the Soviet Union, Candidate of Sciences was a degree roughly corresponding to an American-style PhD.

The Netherlands and Belgium
In the Netherlands and Belgium the "Candidate's diploma" was an undergraduate first-cycle diploma that the university issued to students who passed their candidate's examination. After obtaining the diploma one was entitled to use the academic title "Candidatus" (prenominal abbreviation Cand.). This was the lowest academic degree that could be achieved in these countries, and is roughly comparable with the bachelor's degree from universities (BA or BSc).

The candidate exam took place after the student completed a substantial and pre-determined part of his university education; in the case of a five-year or longer course usually after completion of the third year. Students in a four-year course received the degree at the end of their second or during their third year, depending on the criteria set by the institution.

The candidates degrees were phased out in the Netherlands in 1982, but have been more-or-less replaced by the Bachelor's degree with the introduction of the Bologna Process in Europe in 1999.

References

Academic degrees